The First Federal Electoral District of Quintana Roo (I Distrito Electoral Federal de Quintana Roo) is one of the 300 Electoral Districts into which Mexico is divided for the purpose of elections to the federal Chamber of Deputies and one of three such districts in the state of Quintana Roo.

It elects one deputy to the lower house of Congress for each three-year legislative period, by means of the first past the post system.

District territory
Under the 2005 districting scheme, Quintana Roo's First District covers the municipalities of
Cozumel, Isla Mujeres, Lázaro Cárdenas, Solidaridad, Tulum and non-urban area of the municipality of Benito Juárez (i.e., excluding the city and resort of Cancún).

The district's head town (cabecera distrital), where results from individual polling stations are gathered together and collated, is the city of Playa del Carmen.

Previous districting schemes

1996–2005 district
Between 1996 and 2005, the First District's territory was the same as at present, except that in included the entirety of Benito Juárez, including the city and resort of Cancún. Cancún also served as the district's head town for vote-collecting purposes.

Prior to 1975
Quintana Roo was admitted to the union on 8 October 1975. Prior to that, as a federal territory, it was assigned only one seat in the Chamber of Deputies: for the First District. The Second District was created upon statehood in 1975, halving the territory of the First District.

Deputies returned to Congress from this district

XXXVIII Legislature
1940–1943: Raymundo Sánchez Azueta (PRI)
XXXIX Legislature
1943–1946:
XL Legislature
1946–1949: Manuel Pérez Ávila (PRI)
XLI Legislature
1949–1952: Abel Pavía González (PRI)
XLIV Legislature
1958–1961: Félix Morel Peyrefitte (PRI)
XLV Legislature
1961–1964: Delio Paz Ángeles (PRI)
XLVI Legislature
1964–1967: Luz María Zaleta de Elsner (PRI)
XLVII Legislature
1967–1970: Eliezer Castro Souza (PRI)
XLVIII Legislature
1970–1973: Hernán Pastrana Pastrana (PRI)
XLIX Legislature
1973–1975: Jesús Martínez Ross (PRI)
1975–1976: Sebastián Uc Yam (PRI)
L Legislature
1976–1979: Carlos Gómez Barrera (PRI)
LI Legislature
1979–1980: Pedro Joaquín Coldwell (PRI)
1980–1982: Salvador Ramos Bustamante (PRI)
LII Legislature
1982–1985: Sara Muza Simón (PRI)
LIII Legislature
1985–1988: María Cristina Sangri Aguilar (PRI)
LIV Legislature
1988–1991: Elina Elfi Coral Castilla (PRI)
LV Legislature
1991–1994: Joaquín Hendricks Díaz (PRI)
LVI Legislature
1994–1997: Sara Muza Simón (PRI)
LVII Legislature
1997–2000: Addy Joaquín Coldwell (PRI)
LVIII Legislature
2000–2001: Juan Ignacio García Zalvidea (PAN)
2001–2003: Alicia Ricalde Magaña (PAN)
LIX Legislature
2003–2004: Félix González Canto (PRI)
2004–2006: María Concepción Fajardo Muñoz (PRI)
LX Legislature
2006–2007: Sara Latife Ruiz Chávez (PRI)
2007: Juan Carlos González Hernández (PRI)
2007–2009: Sara Latife Ruiz Chávez (PRI)

References and notes

Federal electoral districts of Mexico
Quintana Roo